Dykes, Camera, Action! is a 2018 American documentary film about the history of lesbian and queer cinema from the women who made it happen. The documentary is the first feature-length film of New York City based director and editor, Caroline Berler.

Synopsis 
The film is the exploration of lesbian cinema from the 1970's to now. Filmmakers Barbara Hammer, Su Friedrich, Rose Troche, Cheryl Dunye, Yoruba Richen, Desiree Akhavan, Vicky Du, film critic B. Ruby Rich, Jenni Olson, and others share from their lives and discuss how they've expressed lesbian and queer identity through film.

Cast reflects on and gives tribute to many influential films and television series:

 Appropriate Behavior (2014)
 Carol (2015)
 Before Stonewall (1984)
 Bound (1996)
 But I'm a Cheerleader (1999)
 The Celluloid Closet (1995)
 Desert Hearts (1985)
 This Film Is Not Yet Rated (2006)
 Go Fish (1994)
 High Art (1998)
 The Joy of Life (2005)
 The L Word television series (2004–2009)
 The Watermelon Woman (1996)

Accolades
Caroline Berler received the Outfest 2018 Programming Award for Emerging Talent.

References

External links
 

2018 films
2018 documentary films
2018 LGBT-related films
American documentary films
American LGBT-related films
Documentary films about lesbians
2010s English-language films
2010s American films